Elan Mastai is a Canadian screenwriter and novelist. He is best known for The F Word, for which he won the Canadian Screen Award for Best Adapted Screenplay at the 2nd Canadian Screen Awards in 2014.

His other screenwriting credits include MVP: Most Vertical Primate and Fury. He has described The F Word as the first time he wrote a screenplay in his own voice, rather than to the commercial demands of a mass-audience film.

He was born and raised in Vancouver, British Columbia, to a Canadian mother and an Israeli immigrant father. Both his parents are Jewish, and they met in Jerusalem. He studied film at Queen's University and Concordia University.

In 2015, Mastai secured a $1.25 million deal for his debut novel, All Our Wrong Todays. A science fiction novel, the book concerns a man from an alternate history utopia who, while part of a time travel experiment, causes a drastic alteration of his history, and regains consciousness in our society. The novel was published on February 7, 2017. In 2017 he was described as working on a screenplay for All Our Wrong Todays, and working on a second novel.

Mastai is supervising producer and staff writer of NBC's This Is Us.

References

External links

Canadian male screenwriters
Canadian male novelists
Canadian science fiction writers
21st-century Canadian novelists
Jewish Canadian writers
Writers from Vancouver
Queen's University at Kingston alumni
Concordia University alumni
Queen's TV alumni
Living people
Best Screenplay Genie and Canadian Screen Award winners
Canadian people of Israeli descent
21st-century Canadian male writers
21st-century Canadian screenwriters
Year of birth missing (living people)